Heinrich Riso (30 June 1882 – August 1952) was a German footballer who played as a defender. He spent his entire career with VfB Leipzig, winning the inaugural German football championship with the club in 1903 and a further title in 1906. He also represented the Germany national team on two occasions, but could not play in Germany's first international match in 1908 because of an injury.

Honours
 German football championship: 1903, 1906

References

External links
 

1882 births
1952 deaths
German footballers
Germany international footballers
Association football defenders
Footballers from Leipzig